Håkan Samuelsson (born 19 March 1951) is a Swedish businessman who has been chairman of the executive board (CEO) of Volvo Cars Corporation AB since October 2012. Previously, he was CEO of MAN SE from January 2005 to November 2009.

Education 
Samuelsson began studying at the Royal Institute of Technology in Stockholm in 1972, obtaining a degree in mechanical engineering (M.Sc.M.E.).

Career 
In 1977 Samuelsson joined Scania AB, Södertälje, Sweden, in the field of braking systems design. He subsequently held various technical management positions, becoming director of Powertrain in 1988. In 1993 he took over as technical director of Scania Latin America and in 1996 was appointed to the executive board of Scania AB, with responsibility for development and production.

In July 2000 he was appointed chairman of the executive board of MAN Nutzfahrzeuge AG and also a member of the executive board of MAN Aktiengesellschaft, both Munich.

Samuelsson was appointed chairman of the executive board of MAN in January 2005, a position he held until resigning on 24 November 2009.

References 

Living people
1951 births
KTH Royal Institute of Technology alumni
MAN SE
Swedish chief executives in the automobile industry
Volvo Cars
Volvo people
People from Motala Municipality